Francis Brady may refer to:

Sir Francis William Brady, 2nd Baronet (1824–1909) of the Brady Baronets
Francis X. Brady (1857–1911), American Jesuit priest
Francis Brady, fictional character in The Butcher Boy (novel)

See also

Frank Brady (disambiguation)
Brady (surname)